Camilla Poindexter (born August 30, 1986) is an American reality television personality and model. She is mostly known for her appearance on season eight of Oxygen's Bad Girls Club. Poindexter was runner-up in Oxygen's fourth season of Love Games: Bad Girls Need Love Too. She has also appeared as a contestant on America's Next Top Model on Cycle 10 where she came out in Top 20. Poindexter was a contestant on the NBC series Momma's Boys and was eliminated on the series finale.

Early life and personal life
Camilla Poindexter was born August 30, 1986 in Harbor City, California as an only child and raised in Long Beach, California, by a single mother. As a child, Poindexter was very active and involved herself in numerous extra-curricular activities such as tennis, dance, taekwondo, and drill team. Poindexter graduated from Woodrow Wilson Classical High School in 2004, where she danced in a group called "Jus Clowning", and at age 14 received a 3-year modeling contract. Camilla went on to study Broadcasting and in hopes to become a hostess and spokesmodel. Poindexter gave birth to her first child, Dylan Noelle Poindexter, on March 18, 2016, whom she had with Washington Redskins offensive lineman Donald Penn of the NFL.

Reality television

Bad Girls Club
Poindexter had originally auditioned for Season 7 of The Bad Girls Club in New Orleans, but was later chosen to be a replacement known as "The Cali Cutthroat" on Bad Girls Club: Las Vegas, where she lasted 3 episodes and marked her territory after numerous physical altercations.

Camilla was a competitor on Season 4 of the Bad Girls Club spin off show Love Games: Bad Girls Need Love Too. Season 4 was hosted by former bad girl Tanisha Thomas. The season ran from November 5, 2012 to January 15, 2013. Camilla placed second on the show, losing to former castmate Amy Cieslowski from Season 8.

From 2012 to 2014, Poindexter hosted many specials for the Bad Girls Club including Making It to the Mansion specials for seasons ten through twelve with season four bad girl Natalie Nunn. She also appeared in promotional commercials for The Smurfs 2 on Oxygen. On January 7, 2014, Poindexter was in the cast of the second season of Bad Girls All-Star Battle. She was eliminated on episode 6 alongside Janelle Shanks from Bad Girls Club: Miami. On October 7, 2014, she was in the cast of the thirteenth season of Bad Girls Club, which is also called Bad Girls Club: Redemption.

Other shows
Poindexter's first gig was in America's Next Top Model where she made it in the Top 20. In 2008, Poindexter participated as a contestant on the NBC series Momma's Boys, the show focused on a group of mothers who are out to choose a woman perfect for their bachelor sons. Poindexter was eliminated during the finale. After the ending of the Momma's Boys series, Poindexter found herself auditioning for America's Next Top Model Cycle 10, where she had made it to the Top 20 finalist but was cut.

Filmography
 Film

 Television

External links

References

1986 births
American female models
Living people
Participants in American reality television series
Actresses from Los Angeles
Actresses from Long Beach, California
People from Harbor City, Los Angeles
Wilson Classical High School alumni
21st-century American women